The 2012 African Women's Championship was a football competition, which was organized by the Confederation of African Football (CAF). The final tournament was held in from 28 October to 11 November in Equatorial Guinea.

Qualification

A total of 24 national teams entered qualification which was held over two rounds. In the preliminary round, 20 nations were drawn in pairs. The ten winners joined the four semifinalists of the 2010 Women's African Football Championship in the first round, where the seven winners qualified for the finals.

Qualified teams

Squads

Group stage
The seven first round winners will join the hosts in the finals. Equatorial Guinea was put in Group A as hosts, while Nigeria as winners of 2010 edition was put into Group B. The draw was held on 17 July 2012.

If two or more teams in the group stage are tied on points tie-breakers are in order:
Points in head-to-head matches between tied teams
Goal difference in head-to-head matches between tied teams
Goals scored in head-to-head matches between tied teams
Goal difference in all group matches
Goals scored in all group matches
Fair play conduct
Drawing of lots

All times are WAT (UTC+1)

Group A

Group B

Knockout stages

Knockout Map

All times are WAT (UTC+1)

Semifinals

Third place play-off

Final

Goalscorers
6 goals
 Genoveva Añonma

5 goals
 Gloria Chinasa

4 goals
 Ines Nrehy
 Andisiwe Mgcoyi

3 goals
 Jade Boho

2 goals
 Adrienne Iven
 Adriana Aparecida Costa
 Stella Mbachu
 Perpetua Nkwocha

1 goal

 Jeanine Alexise Gnago
 Ange N'Guessan
 Josée Nahi
 Christine Manie
 Gabrielle Onguéné
 Gaëlle Enganamouit

 Francine Zouga
 Lucie Mengi Nona
 Jolie Tutzolana
 Jumária Barbosa de Santana
 Ogonna Chukwudi

 Ngozi Ebere
 Martina Ohadugha
 Esther Sunday
 Leandra Smeda
 Janine van Wyk

Own goal
 Bwadi Mwalutshe (playing against Equatorial Guinea)

References and notes

External links
 BBC ;Results & Fixtures
 Results at soccerway.com

 
Women's Africa Cup of Nations tournaments
Women
International association football competitions hosted by Equatorial Guinea
CAF